Birgitta Ann-Agnes "Bride" Adams-Ray (29 April 1907 – 13 August 1993) was a Swedish high jumper. She competed in the 1928 Summer Olympics.

References

External links
 

1907 births
1993 deaths
Athletes (track and field) at the 1928 Summer Olympics
Swedish female high jumpers
Olympic athletes of Sweden
Athletes from Stockholm